{{safesubst:#invoke:RfD|||month = March
|day = 14
|year = 2023
|time = 20:24
|timestamp = 20230314202401

|content=
REDIRECT Fairy Fencer F

}}